Erland Peter Brand (5 October 1922 – 17 October 2020) was a Swedish painter, draftsman and printmaker. He lived and worked in Gothenburg.

Biography
Brand was born in Arvika and educated at Valand Art School in Gothenburg, where he also worked as a teacher for three years. He exhibited at a variety of institutions around Sweden, such as Galerie Blanche, Stockholm in 1958, Prince Eugene's Waldemarsudde 1985/86, Gothenburg Art Museum 1995 Rackstadmuseet, Arvika 1999 at Moderna Museet, Stockholm 2000. He had a guaranteed income for life of at least five base amounts (about 214 000 SEK in 2009) per annum from the Swedish government through its income guarantee for artists.

Brand was the son of house painter Johan Brand (1883–1955) and Ester Matilda Brand née Pettersson (1895–1994). His wife was Inga Brand née Brorson, also an artist with whom he had a son and a daughter. He died in Gothenburg.

References 
 Olle Niklasson "Bortom Tiden" in Kulturtidningen Zenit #62 2019 (comprehensive article)

20th-century Swedish painters
Swedish male painters
21st-century Swedish painters
1922 births
2020 deaths
20th-century Swedish male artists
21st-century Swedish male artists
Valand School of Fine Arts alumni